Daniel Hahn  (born 26 November 1973) is a British writer, editor and translator.

He is the author of a number of works of non-fiction, including the history book The Tower Menagerie, and one of the editors of The Ultimate Book Guide, a series of reading guides for children and teenagers, the first volume of which won the Blue Peter Book Award. Other titles include Happiness Is a Watermelon on Your Head (a picture-book for children), The Oxford Guide to Literary Britain and Ireland (a reference book), brief biographies of the poets Samuel Taylor Coleridge and Percy Bysshe Shelley, and a new edition of The Oxford Companion to Children's Literature.

His translation of The Book of Chameleons by José Eduardo Agualusa won the Independent Foreign Fiction Prize in 2007. His translation of A General Theory of Oblivion, also by José Eduardo Agualusa, won the 2017 International Dublin Literary Award, with Hahn receiving 25% of the €100,000 prize. His other translations include Pelé's autobiography and work by novelists José Luís Peixoto, Philippe Claudel, María Dueñas, José Saramago, Eduardo Halfon, Gonçalo M. Tavares, and others.

A former chair of the Translators Association and the Society of Authors, as well as national programme director of the British Centre for Literary Translation, he currently serves on the board of trustees of the Society of Authors and a number of other organisations working with literature, literacy and free expression, including English PEN, The Children's Bookshow and Modern Poetry in Translation.

In 2017, Hahn donated half his winnings from the International Dublin Literary Award to help establish a new prize for debut literary translation – the TA First Translation Prize.

Hahn was appointed Officer of the Order of the British Empire (OBE) in the 2020 Birthday Honours for services to literature.

References

External links
 Daniel Hahn's website
 Daniel Hahn's profile on Worldcat.org
 Daniel Hahn's profile in The Guardian
 

1973 births
British non-fiction writers
British translators
Literary translators
Living people
Officers of the Order of the British Empire
Place of birth missing (living people)